During the 2004 United States presidential election, the online edition of Editor & Publisher, a journal covering the North American newspaper industry, tabulated newspaper endorsements for the two major candidates, Republican incumbent George W. Bush and Democratic challenger John Kerry.  , their tally shows the following:

They note that 43 papers which had endorsed Bush for the 2000 election switched to endorse Kerry for 2004, whereas 8 papers which had endorsed Al Gore in 2000 switched to endorse Bush for 2004.

They also listed 18 papers, all of which endorsed Bush in 2000, that declared their neutrality for the 2004 election.

They note that the total daily circulation of the papers that have endorsed each candidate is 20,791,336 for Kerry vs. 14,455,046 for Bush.

The following is a partial list of the endorsements:

 Choose not to endorse anyone (all backed Bush in 2000):
Cleveland Plain Dealer
Detroit News
Harrisburg, Pennsylvania Patriot-News
New Orleans Times-Picayune
Scranton, Pennsylvania Times
Tampa, Florida Tribune
Winston-Salem, North Carolina Journal
 For George W. Bush:
Amarillo Globe-News
Austin American-Statesman
Birmingham, Alabama News
Bluefield, West Virginia Daily Telegraph
Bloomington, Illinois Pantagraph
Canton The Repository
Chicago Tribune
Carlsbad, New Mexico Current-Argus
Carbondale, Illinois Southern Illiosian
Cedar Rapids, Iowa Gazette
Champaign, Illinois News-Gazette
Clarksville, Tennessee Leaf-Chronicle
Columbus Dispatch
Cincinnati Enquirer
Cincinnati Post
Dallas Morning News
Denver Rocky Mountain News
Denver Post
Evansville, Indiana Courier & Press
Easton, Maryland Star Democrat
Easton, Pennsylvania Express-Times
El Paso, Texas Times
Fargo, North Dakota Forum
Farmington, New Mexico Daily Times
Findlay, Ohio Courier
Fredericksburg, Virginia The Free Lance–Star
Freeport, Illinois Standard Journal
Fort Worth Star-Telegram
Fort Smith, Arkansas Southwest Times Record
Grand Junction, Colorado Daily Sentinel
Houston Chronicle
Indianapolis Star
Lakeland, Florida Ledger
Las Vegas Review-Journal
Las Cruces, New Mexico Sun-News
Little Rock, Arkansas Arkansas Democrat-Gazette
Lowell, Massachusetts The Sun
Manchester, New Hampshire Union-Leader
Mason City, Iowa Globe-Gazette
Midland, Michigan Midland Daily News
Mobile Register
New Philadelphia, Ohio Times Reporter
New York Daily News
New York Sun
New York Post
Ocala, Florida Star-Banner
Oklahoma City, Oklahoma Oklahoman
Omaha, Nebraska World-Herald
Parkersburg, West Virginia The Parkersburg News
Parkersburg, West Virginia The Parkersburg Sentinel
Phoenix Arizona Republic
Pittsburgh, Pennsylvania Pittsburgh Tribune-Review
Pontiac, Michigan The Oakland Press
Poughkeepsie, New York Journal
Pueblo, Colorado The Pueblo Chieftain
Richmond, Virginia Times-Dispatch
Riverside, California Press-Enterprise
Saint Joseph, Michigan Herald-Palladium
Salt Lake Tribune
San Antonio Express-News
San Diego Union-Tribune
Savannah, Georgia Morning News
Sioux City, Iowa Journal
Sioux Falls, South Dakota Argus Leader
Spartanburg, South Carolina Herald-Journal
St. Paul, Minnesota Pioneer Press
Stockton, California Record
Tulsa, Oklahoma World
Vacaville, California Reporter
Vancouver, Washington The Columbian
York, Pennsylvania Daily Record
Washington Times
Everett, Washington "The Everett Herald" For John Kerry:
Akron, Ohio Beacon-Journal
Albuquerque Tribune
Allentown Morning Call
Anchorage, Alaska Daily News
Atlanta Journal-Constitution
Baltimore, Maryland The Sun
Bangor, Maine Daily News
Bismarck, North Dakota Tribune
Boise, Idaho Idaho Statesman
Boston Globe
Bradenton, Florida Herald
Bremerton, Washington Sun
Bridgewater, New Jersey Courier-News
Buffalo News
Charleston, West Virginia Gazette
Charlotte, North Carolina Observer
Chattanooga, Tennessee Times
Chicago Sun-Times
Columbia, Missouri Daily Tribune
Concord, New Hampshire Monitor
Crawford, Texas Lone Star Iconoclast
Davenport, Iowa Quad-City Times
Dayton, Ohio Daily News
Daytona Beach, Florida News Journal
Delaware News Journal
Des Moines Register
Detroit Free Press
Duluth, Minnesota News Tribune
Durango, Colorado Herald
Economist 
Everett, Washington Herald
Financial Times
Falls Church, Virginia News-Press
Flint, Michigan Journal
Fort Collins, Colorado Coloradoan
Fresno Bee
Grand Forks, North Dakota Herald
Hackensack, New Jersey Record of Bergen County
Honolulu Advertiser
The Idaho Statesman
The Ithaca Journal
Jackson, Tennessee Sun
Kansas City, Missouri Star
Lansing, Michigan State Journal
Las Vegas Sun
Lexington, Kentucky Herald-Leader
Long Island, New York Newsday
Louisville, Kentucky Courier-Journal
Medford, Oregon Mail-Tribune
Memphis, Tennessee Commercial Appeal
Merced, California Sun-Star
Miami Herald
Minneapolis Star Tribune
Modesto, California Bee
Montgomery, Alabama Advertiser
Muskegon, Michigan Chronicle
Myrtle Beach, South Carolina The Sun News
Nashua, New Hampshire Telegraph
Nashville, Tennessee The Tennessean
The Nation
Newark, New Jersey Star-Ledger
Newport News, Virginia Daily Press
The New Republic
New York Times Union
The New Yorker
New York Times
Olympia, Washington Olympian
Orlando Sentinel
Palm Beach Post
Philadelphia Inquirer
Philadelphia, Pennsylvania Daily News
Pittsburgh, Pennsylvania Post-Gazette
Port Huron, Michigan Times Herald
Portland, Maine Herald-Press
Portland Oregonian
Raleigh, North Carolina News and Observer
Reno, Nevada Gazette-Journal
Roanoke, Virginia Times
Rockford, Illinois Register Star
Sacramento Bee
San Francisco Chronicle
San Jose Mercury-News
Santa Rosa, California The Press Democrat
St. Louis Post-Dispatch
St. Louis American
St. Petersburg Times
Seattle Times
Seattle Post-Intelligencer
The Sheboygan Press
Springfield, Massachusetts Republican
Springfield, Missouri News-Leader
State College, Pennsylvania Centre Daily Times
Tacoma, Washington News Tribune
Toledo, Ohio Blade
Traverse City, Michigan Record-Eagle
Trenton, New Jersey Times
Tucson Daily Star
Vallejo, California Times-Herald
Washington Post
Waco, Texas Tribune-Herald
Wilkes-Barre, Pennsylvania Times Leader and Citizen's Voice
Woodbury, New Jersey Gloucester County Times
Worcester, Massachusetts Telegram and Gazette

See also
 Newspaper endorsements in the United States presidential primaries

2004 United States presidential election
2004
2004 in mass media
2004 United States presidential election endorsements